The Church of St. Nicholas in Erdevik is Serbian Orthodox church in Vojvodina, Serbia. The church was constructed in 1804. The building is one of three churches in the village with the second one being Roman Catholic church from 1890 and the third Slovak Evangelical Church from 1902. Iconostasis of the church was painted in 1807 by Georgije Bakalović. The church is a single-nave building with a semicircular altar apse in the east and a representative bell tower. The Institute for the Protection of Cultural Monuments of Sremska Mitrovica adopted the initial decision on protection (no. 189) of 8 December 1977 while the building was listed as a protected cultural heritage of Serbia in 1997.

See also
Eparchy of Srem

References

19th-century Eastern Orthodox church buildings
Serbian Orthodox church buildings in Vojvodina
Cultural Monuments of Great Importance (Serbia)